Emilia Kilpua (b. November 18, 1977 in Oulu) is a Finnish space scientist. She is currently Professor of Space Physics at the University of Helsinki.

Background and career 
Kilpua was born and raised in Oulu, northern Finland, where aurora are commonplace in winter. She studied theoretical physics and mathematics at the University of Helsinki, followed by a masters and PhD on "Interplanetary shocks, magnetic clouds and magnetospheric storms", completed in 2005. She undertook a postdoctoral research associate post in the Space Sciences Laboratory at UC Berkeley. She moved back to Finland in 2008.

Scientific interests 
Kilpua's primary research focus is space weather, particularly with an eye to improving forecasting. She has made advances in our understanding of the formation and propagation of coronal mass ejections to Earth, as well as the response of the magnetospheric system, particularly the Earth's radiation belts.

Awards and honours 
2022: Associate editor for Astrophysics and Space Science
2021: Awarded the Finnish Academy of Sciences awarded him the Väisälä prize
2020: Member of Finnish Academy of Letters and Sciences
2020: Member of Finnish Space Situational Awareness working team
2019: 2021 President of Board of The Finnish Physical Society
2017: Member of Scientific Committee on Solar-Terrestrial Physics (SCOSTEP)
2017: Awarded a European Research Council Consolidator Grant
2017: 2021 Member of Board of Solar Physics Division - European Physical Society
2016: 2019 Vice president of Board of The Finnish Physical Society
2015: Co-Investigator for BebiColombo SIXS

References 

Living people
Finnish women scientists
Vaisala Prize Laureates
Academic staff of the University of Helsinki
Year of birth missing (living people)
People from Oulu
University of Helsinki alumni
Space scientists
Women space scientists
21st-century Finnish scientists